Serajul Huq (1 April 1905 – 4 March 2005) was a Bangladeshi educationist.

Early life and education
Huq was born in Noakhali District in 1905. He passed matriculation examination in 1921 from Dhaka Muhsinia Madrasa and Intermediate examination in 1923 from Dhaka Islamic Intermediate College. He then enrolled to University of Dhaka. He earned BA with Honors in Islamic Studies in 1926 and MA in Persian in 1927. In 1934 Huq earned his PhD degree from University of London.

Career
In 1928 Huq joined Dhaka University as a faculty as Assistant Lecturer in the Department of Arabic and Islamic Studies. He became Professor in 1951. In 1979 Huq was elected President of the Asiatic Society of Bangladesh.

Awards
 Sitara-e-Imtiaz (1969)
 Fellowship of the Asiatic Society of Bangladesh (1973)
 Independence Day Award (1983)
 Islamic Foundation Padak (1985)
 Professor Sukumar Sen Gold Medal of the Asiatic Society of Calcutta (1996)
 Ekushey Padak (1997)

References 

1905 births
2005 deaths
Recipients of the Ekushey Padak
Recipients of the Independence Day Award
University of Dhaka alumni
Academic staff of the University of Dhaka
Bangladeshi scholars
People from Noakhali District
Alumni of the University of London
Islamic studies scholars